The 2002 FC Barcelona Dragons season was the tenth season for the franchise in the NFL Europe League (NFLEL). The team was led by head coach Jack Bicknell in his tenth year, and played its home games at Estadi Olímpic de Montjuïc and Mini Estadi in Barcelona, Spain. They finished the regular season in sixth place with a record of two wins and eight losses.

Offseason

Free agent draft

Personnel

Staff

Roster

Standings

References

Barcelona
Barcelona Dragons seasons